Xu Yifan and Zheng Saisai were the defending champions, but Zheng chose to play in Hong Kong instead.

Xu played alongside Magda Linette, but they lost in the final to Christina McHale and Peng Shuai, 6–7(8–10), 0–6.

Seeds

Draw

References 
 Draw

Tianjin Open - Doubles
Tianjin Open